Rear Admiral Alan John Ogilvie Martin,  is a retired officer of the Royal New Zealand Navy, who served as Chief of the Navy from 30 November 2015 to 29 November 2018.

Born in Dunedin, Martin joined the navy in 1979. He served as commander of the Royal New Zealand Navy Fleet as the Maritime Component Commander from March 2011 to September 2013. Martin was appointed Member of the New Zealand Order of Merit (MNZM) in the 1996 Queen's Birthday Honours. In the 2003 Queen's Birthday Honours, he was promoted to Officer of the same order.

References

Living people
Officers of the New Zealand Order of Merit
Military personnel from Dunedin
Royal New Zealand Navy admirals
Year of birth missing (living people)